Haruka Sunada (砂田 遙 Sunada Haruka, born 18 April 1988) is a Japanese volleyball player who plays for PFU BlueCats.

Profile

Clubs
TaiseiJoshi High School → Takefuji Bamboo (2007–2009) → PFU BlueCats (2009-)

National team
2008 – 1st AVC Women's Cup

References

External links
JVA Biography

Japanese women's volleyball players
Takefuji Bamboo players
Living people
1988 births
PFU BlueCats players